The Walter Camp Coach of the Year Award is given annually to the collegiate American football head coach adjudged by a group of National Collegiate Athletic Association (NCAA) Division I Football Bowl Subdivision (FBS) head coaches and sports information directors under the auspices of the Walter Camp Football Foundation as the "Coach of the Year"; the award is named for Walter Camp, a progenitor of the sport. The foundation also honors a Walter Camp Man of the Year for service.

The award has been presented yearly since 1967 during the Walter Camp Football Foundation's annual awards weekend, held on the campus of Yale University.

Winners

References

External links
Official website

College football coach of the year awards in the United States
Awards established in 1967